Kudumiyanmalai   is a village in the Annavasal revenue block of Pudukkottai district, Tamil Nadu, India.

Demographics 

As per the 2001 census, Kudumiyanmalai  had a total population of 531 with 265 males and 266 females. Out of the total population, 320 people were literate.

Climate

References

See also
 Sittanavasal Cave
 Meivazhi Salai

Villages in Pudukkottai district